Leptodini is a tribe of darkling beetles in the subfamily Pimeliinae of the family Tenebrionidae. There are at least two genera in Leptodini, found in the Palearctic.

Genera
These genera belong to the tribe Leptodini
 Leptodes Dejean, 1834
 Tapenopsis Solier, 1843

References

Further reading

 
 

Tenebrionoidea